CS Rapid București is a Romanian professional handball club based in Giulești, in the northwestern parts of Bucharest. Founded in 1934, they play their home games at the Sala Rapid. The club competes in the Liga Națională, the top division of Romanian handball. They won their first major honour, the League championship, in 1961. The club won the Romanian Cup for the first time in 2004, and their first European honour, the European Cup, in 1964.

Rapid achieved the EHF treble. Domestically, the club has won six league titles and one Romanian Cup. Internationally, they have won one Champions League, one European League, and one European Cup since their inception.

They are currently competing in the 2022–23 Women's EHF Champions League.

Honours

National competitions

League titles
Liga Națională 
Winners (6): 1961, 1962, 1963, 1967, 2003, 2022

Cups
Cupa României
Winners (1): 2004

European competitions
Champions League
Winners (1): 1964

European League
Winners (1): 1993

European Cup
Winners (1): 2000

European record

Players

Current squad   
Squad for the 2022–23 season

Goalkeepers 
 12  Diana Ciucă
 16  Denisa Şandru
 23  Ivana Kapitanović

Left Wings
 18  Jennifer Gutiérrez Bermejo
 20  Dorina Korsós

Right Wings
  17  Marta López
 77  Alexandra Badea

Line Players 
 10  Albertina Kassoma
 27  Lorena Ostase
 44  Ainhoa Hernández

Left Backs
  11  Gabriela Perianu
 22  Orlane Kanor
 99  Sorina Grozav

Centre Backs
 7  Eliza Buceschi
 34  Alicia Fernández
 79  Estavana Polman

Right Backs
 21  Irene Espínola
 35  Azenaide Carlos
 88  Anđela Janjušević

Transfers
Transfers for the 2023–24 season

 Joining
 Laura Kanor (LW) (from  Metz Handball)
 Lara González Ortega (LB) (from  Paris 92)
 Paula Arcos (LB/RB) (from  Super Amara Bera Bera)

 Leaving
 Jennifer Gutiérrez Bermejo (LW) (to  CSM București)

Selected former players   
  Alina Dobrin
  Cristina Vărzaru
  Aurelia Brădeanu 
  Paula Ungureanu 
  Oana Manea 
  Julie Foggea
  Alexandra Lacrabère

Top scorers in the EHF Champions League 
(All-Time) – Last updated on 16 February 2023

References

Sports clubs in Bucharest
Liga Națională (women's handball) clubs
Handball clubs established in 1934